John Eriksson (born 8 January 1974, Hortlax (Piteå), Sweden) is a Swedish musician and composer best known as a founding member of Peter Bjorn and John.

Career
He was born in 1974 and raised in Hortlax (Piteå), Sweden. In 1994, he founded the percussion quartet Peaux, for which he was also a musician and composer. From 1995 to 1999, he was a musician in the Swedish Radio Symphony Orchestra, performing in concerts and recordings with Esa-Pekka Salonen, Myung-Whun Chung, Herbert Blomstedt and Evgeny Svetlanov. He was also in a percussion/trumpet duo with Tora Thorslund, and in 1998 he was a marimba soloist during the Stockholm International Percussion Event. From 1999 to 2008, he was a musician, arranger and composer in the Kroumata Percussion Ensemble.

From 1999, he was one of the founding members, musician, composer, arranger and producer of the band Peter Bjorn and John. More recently, he has recorded as dance music act Hortlax Cobra, who produced 3 vinyl EPs. Another side project is "disco-kraut" act Holiday For Strings. He was also composer for projects with Teenage Engineering. In 2012 he was one of the founding members of the artist collective INGRID, and Hortlax Cobra contributed a song to their Record Store Day compilation called Ingrid Volume 1.

Discography

As composer, arranger

 Peter Bjorn And John: Gimme Some 
 Peter Bjorn And John: Living Thing (also producer)
 Peter Bjorn And John: Seaside Rock (also producer)
 Peter Bjorn And John: Writers Block
 Peter Bjorn And John: Falling Out
 Peter Bjorn And John: Peter Bjorn And John
 Peter Bjorn And John: Beats Traps and Backgrounds (EP)
 Hortlax Cobra: Night Shift (also producer)
 Hortlax Cobra: Everybody's Talking About Hortlax Cobra (also producer)
 Hortlax Cobra: Nobody Knows Hortlax Cobra (also producer)
 Hortlax Cobra: Stop and Smell the Hortlax Cobra (also producer)
 Holiday For Strings: CD
 Holiday For Strings: Two Of You (EP)
 Holiday For Strings: Favorite Flavor
 Peaux – Peaux 
 Kroumata – Encores 
 Depeche Mode – Fragile Tension (remix)
 First Floor Power – The Jacket (remix)
 Golden Filter – Hide Me (remix)
 The Temper Trap – Fools (remix)
 Peter Bjorn And John: Writers Block Remix (remix)
 Wildbirds and Peacedrums – My Heart (remix)
 Les Big Byrd – Zig Smile (remix)
 Neneh Cherry and The Thing: Accordion (remix)

As Musician: (excerpts)

 Lykke Li: Youth Novels 
 Lykke Li: Wounded Rhymes 
 Teddybears: Musik ur teaterföreställningen Don Carlos
 Magnus Granberg & Skogen – Ist Gefallen In Den Schnee 
 Fibes Oh Fibes: Album
 Hans-Erik Dyvik Husby: I ljuset av Cornelis
 Shout Out Louds – Our Ill Wills 
 Shout Out Louds – Oh, Sweetheart E.P.
 Taken By Trees – Open Field 
 Sahara Hotnights – What if leaving is a loving thing 
 Existensminimum – Last night my head tried to explode and i wrote everything down
 Monty's Loco – Man Overboard
 Marit Bergman – I think it's a rainbow
 Moneybrother – To die Alone
 Deportees – Damage Goods 
 Sarah Blasko – As day follows night
 Smile – A flash in the night
 Smile – Satellite Blues (Vinyl Single)
 Nicolai Dunger – A Dress Book
 Nicolai Dunger – Here's my song
 Nicolai Dunger – Sjunger Edith Södergran
 The Concretes – In Colour 
 Yttling Jazz – Oh lord, why can't I keep my big mouth shut
 EP's Trailerpark – L'esperit d'escalier
 Folke – Folke
 Kroumata / Lahti Symphony Orchestra: Kalevi Aho – Symphony Nr 11 (Kroumata Symphony) 
 Kroumata / Oslo Philharmonic : Rolf Wallin – Act 
 André Chini / Kroumata / Norrbottens Kammarorkester – Eallin
 A Spirit's Whisper – selected works by Bo Nilsson 
 Swedish Radio Symphony Orchestra / Esa Pekka Salonen: Dallapiccola – Il Prigionerio
 Swedish Radio Symphony Orchestra / Evgeny Svetlanov: Shostakovitj v Symphony Nr 7
 Swedish Radio Symphony Orchestra / Leif Segerstam: Sven-David Sandström-High Mass
 Swedish Radio Symphony Orchestra / Leif Segerstam: Lutoslawski, Penderecki Cello concertos

References

Additional sources
 
 
 

Swedish record producers
Swedish rock musicians
Swedish drummers
Male drummers
1974 births
Living people
People from Piteå Municipality
Peter Bjorn and John members
21st-century drummers
21st-century Swedish male musicians